Plemyria georgii, or George's carpet moth, is a species of geometrid moth in the family Geometridae. It is found in North America.

The MONA or Hodges number for Plemyria georgii is 7216.

References

Further reading

External links

 

Hydriomenini
Articles created by Qbugbot
Moths described in 1896